Joseph Israel Lobdell (December 02, 1829 - May 28, 1912) was a 19th-century person who was assigned female at birth and lived as a man for sixty years, and is usually regarded today as a transgender man. An 1877 New York Times article referred to Lobdell's life as "one of the most singular family histories ever recorded". Writer William Klaber wrote an historical novel, The Rebellion of Miss Lucy Ann Lobdell, which was based on Lobdell's life. An 1883 account by P. M. Wise, which cast Lobdell as a "lesbian", was the first use of that word in an American publication.

Life 

Joseph Lobdell was born December 2, 1829 to a working-class family living in Westerlo, Albany County, New York. Lobdell married George Washington Slater, who was reportedly mentally abusive and abandoned Lobdell shortly after the birth of their daughter, Helen. Lobdell was known for marksmanship and nicknamed "The Female Hunter of Delaware County". He wrote a memoir about his hunting adventures, his disastrous marriage and his feelings about God, ending with a plea for equal employment for women. He was also known to be an accomplished fiddle player and opened a singing school for a time. While working at the singing school, he became engaged to a young woman. A rival for her affection learned Lobdell was assigned female at birth and threatened to tar and feather him. Lobdell's fiancé warned him and he escaped. Lobdell received a Civil War pension when Slater was killed in the war. Lobdell entered the County Poor House in Delhi, New York, in 1860, where he met Marie Louise Perry. Perry was a poor but well-educated woman, whose husband left her shortly after they eloped. He later married Perry in 1861 in Wayne County, Pennsylvania. They spent years roaming the woods together with their pet bear, living in nomadic poverty, surviving off hunting, gathering and charity. Then they were arrested for vagrancy and sent to Stroudsburg jail where "discovery that the supposed man was a woman was made". Joseph was later arrested again for wearing male clothes. Marie wrote a letter using a stick and pokeberry ink begging the jail to free her husband.

In 1879, Lobdell was taken away to the Willard Insane Asylum in Ovid, New York. While in the asylum, Lobdell became a patient of Dr. P. M. Wise, who published a brief article, "A Case of Sexual Perversion", in which the doctor noted Lobdell said "she considered herself a man in all that the name implies". Newspapers published two premature obituaries for him, first in 1879, then in 1885. His wife had no reason to doubt the later ones, though he was presumed to have died on May 28, 1912, and is buried in the Binghamton State Hospital Cemetery.

References

External links 
 
 
 Minnesota’s ‘Wild Woman’ charged with impersonating a man in 1858
 Approved Pension File for Lucy A. L. Slater, Widow of Private George Slater, Company G, 128th New York Infantry Regiment (WC-259782)
 

1829 births
1912 deaths
Transgender men
People from Albany County, New York
LGBT people from New York (state)